Isabella Brant (or Brandt; 1591 – 15 July 1626) was the first wife of the  Flemish painter Peter Paul Rubens, who painted several portraits of her.

Family 
She was the eldest daughter of Jan Brant, an important city official in Antwerp, and Clara de Moy, daughter of Hendrik de Moy. Her aunt Marie de Moy was married to Phillipe I Rubens, brother of her future husband. Isabella Brant married the brother of her uncle Peter Paul on 3 October 1609 in St. Michael's Abbey, Antwerp. They had three children: Clara, Nicolaas, Lord of Rameyen and Albert. She was 34 years old when she died of the plague.

Jan Brant;married to Clara de Moy; daughter of Hendrik de Moy.
Isabella Brant, (1591–1626);married to Peter Paul Rubens.
Albert Rubens
Hendrik Brant (1594); died in youth.
Jan Brant (1596); died without children.
Clara Brant (1599);married in 1619 to Daniel II Fourment, Lord of Wijtvliet, brother of Helena Fourment

Works 
Several paintings of Brant and one important drawing of her by Rubens survive, in addition to a portrait of her by Rubens' disciple and assistant, Anthony van Dyck.

In 1977, Brant appeared on a postage stamp of Anguilla.

Gallery

Notes

Further reading
 (see index).

External links

1591 births
1626 deaths
17th-century deaths from plague (disease)
17th-century Dutch women
Models from Antwerp
Family of Peter Paul Rubens
People of the Holy Roman Empire